Karunamani Hashan Chamara Silva (born 28 September 1995) is a Sri Lankan cricketer. He made his first-class debut for Kalutara Town Club in Tier B of the 2019–20 Premier League Tournament on 5 February 2020. He made his Twenty20 debut on 7 March 2021, for Panadura Sports Club in the 2020–21 SLC Twenty20 Tournament. He made his List A debut on 24 March 2021, for Panadura Sports Club in the 2020–21 Major Clubs Limited Over Tournament.

References

External links
 

1995 births
Living people
Sri Lankan cricketers
Kalutara Town Club cricketers
Panadura Sports Club cricketers
Place of birth missing (living people)